Eoophyla accra is a moth in the family Crambidae. It was described by Strand in 1913. It is found in Angola, Cameroon, the Republic of the Congo, the Democratic Republic of the Congo, Equatorial Guinea (Bioko), Ghana, Sierra Leone and Uganda.

The base of the forewings is dull fuscous towards the costa. The subbasal area is white and the median area of the wing is ochreous. The base of the hindwings is white. There is an ochreous median fascia, edged with fuscous and the postmedian area is white.

References

Eoophyla
Moths described in 1913
Moths of Africa